Anne Marie Nardacci (born 1977) is an American lawyer from New York who is a United States district judge of the United States District Court for the Northern District of New York.

Education 

Nardacci received a Bachelor of Arts, magna cum laude, from Georgetown University in 1998 and a Juris Doctor, cum laude, from Cornell Law School in 2002.

Career 

From 1999 to 2000, Nardacci served on the staff of Congressman Michael McNulty in Washington, D.C. From 2002 to 2005, Nardacci was an associate at Skadden, Arps, Slate, Meagher & Flom in New York City. Since 2005, she has been with the Albany, New York, office Boies Schiller Flexner LLP; beginning as an associate from 2005 to 2012, then as a counsel from 2012 to 2020 before being elevated to partner in 2020. During her legal career, she has specialized in anti-trust law.

Federal judicial service 

On April 27, 2022, President Joe Biden announced his intent to nominate Nardacci after she had been recommended by U.S. Senator Chuck Schumer to serve as a United States district judge of the United States District Court for the Northern District of New York. On May 19, 2022, her nomination was sent to the Senate. President Biden nominated Nardacci to the seat vacated by Judge Gary L. Sharpe, who assumed senior status on January 1, 2016. On July 27, 2022, a hearing on her nomination was held before the Senate Judiciary Committee. Nardacci was given a majority "Qualified" rating by the American Bar Association but was the first judicial nominee by President Biden to receive "Not Qualified" votes from the Standing Committee on the Federal Judiciary. On September 15, 2022, her nomination was reported out of committee by a 14–8 vote. On November 30, 2022, the United States Senate invoked cloture on her nomination by a 52–45 vote. Later that day, her nomination was confirmed in a 52–44 vote. She received her judicial commission on December 16, 2022.

References

External links 

1977 births
Living people
21st-century American women judges
21st-century American judges
21st-century American women lawyers
21st-century American lawyers
Boies Schiller Flexner people
Cornell Law School alumni
Georgetown University alumni
Judges of the United States District Court for the Northern District of New York
Lawyers from Albany, New York
Skadden, Arps, Slate, Meagher & Flom people
United States district court judges appointed by Joe Biden